The Athenian Greek-Phoenician inscriptions are 18 ancient Phoenician inscriptions found in the region of Athens, Greece (also known as Attica). They represent the second largest group of foreign inscriptions in the region after the Thracians (25 inscriptions). 9 of the inscriptions are bilingual Phoenician-Greek and written on steles. Almost all of them bear the indication of the deceased's city of origin, not just the more general designation of their ethnicity, like most other non-Greek inscriptions in the region.

The bilingual inscriptions

Athens inscriptions

Piraeus inscriptions

References

Bibliography

External links 
 Artemidorus stele on Attic Inscriptions Online
 KAI 60 on the Louvre site (AO 4827)
 Noumenius stele on the Louvre site (AO 4834)

Phoenician inscriptions
Ancient Athens
Archaeological discoveries in Greece
KAI inscriptions
Phoenician steles
Archaeological artifacts
Collections of the Louvre